, or ANN, is a Japanese commercial television network run by TV Asahi Corporation. The network's responsibility includes the syndication of national television news bulletins to its regional affiliates, and news exchange between the stations. Its member stations also broadcast non-news programs originating from TV Asahi.

It also operated, between 1989 and 2013, the 24-hour satellite and cable news channel Asahi Newstar.

All-Nippon News Network stations
Bold indicates founding members

Former stations
Bold indicates former primary affiliate

JapaNews24 
ANN operates since at least 2018 , an around-the-clock online feed aimed mainly at Japanese people abroad, available on ANN's YouTube official channel. JapaNews24 airs continuously news stories from ANN newscasts and programmes such as Hōdō Station, as well as content from sister service AbemaNews, on tape delay without a fixed schedule.

References

External links
  

 
24-hour television news channels in Japan
Television channels and stations established in 1970